Béla Nikolai Anda (born 4 April 1963 in Bonn) is a German journalist and communication manager, who served under chancellor Gerhard Schröder as head of the German Federal Government's Press and Information Office and as the German government's spokesperson from 2002 to 2005. Anda currently runs his own PR company.

Biography 
Anda was born in Bonn as the son of the Hungarian nutritionist and a teacher. After graduating from school and training as a reserve officer (lieutenant of the reserve) in Panzer Reconnaissance Battalion 3 (Panzeraufklärungsbataillon 3)  in Lüneburg, Anda completed a traineeship by the newspaper Welt am Sonntag in 1984, where he worked as a political editor until 1986. The subsequent study of political science at the Free University of Berlin and at the London School of Economics completed the Erasmus scholarship holder in 1991. He then held various positions at the newspaper Bild until 1998.

Anda was appointed as deputy government spokesman under Uwe-Karsten Heye after the red-green coalition under chancellor Gerhard Schröder took over the government. After the re-election of the government coalition, Heye was put into retirement and Anda, meanwhile a member of the SPD, was appointed government spokesman and head of the federal press office in October 2002. In his role, he supported the Agenda 2010 initiated by Schröder communicatively. After Angela Merkel's election as Chancellor, Anda has been given temporary retirement.

Béla Anda has been running his own PR agency since 2016. Anda has been running Gerhard Schröder's podcast Die Agenda since 2020.

References 

German male journalists
German television journalists
German broadcast news analysts
1963 births
Living people
Spokespersons